Yarrow essential oil is a volatile oil including the chemical proazulene.  The dark blue essential oil is extracted by steam distillation of the flowers of yarrow (Achillea millefolium).

It kills the larvae of the mosquito Aedes albopictus.

References 

Essential oils

Further reading 
Supercritical CO2 extraction of essential oil from yarrow
Production of Yarrow (Achillea millefolium L.) in Norway: Essential Oil Content and Quality
Physicochemical Characteristics and Fatty Acid Profile of Yarrow (Achillea tenuifolia) Seed Oil
Essential oil composition of three polyploids in the Achillea millefolium ‘complex’
Phytochemical analysis of the essential oil of Achillea millefolium L. from various European Countries
Essential oil composition of two yarrow taxonomic forms